Sony Television, Sony TV, or Sony HD may refer to any of the following television-related products from Japanese conglomerate Sony:
 Television sets designed and manufactured by Sony Corporation in Japan
 Trinitron, television hardware brand (1968-2008)
 Bravia (brand), television hardware brand (2005-present)
 Sony WEGA, television hardware brand (1975-2005)
 Sony Watchman, pocket television line (1982-2000)
 Television offerings from Sony Pictures in the United States
 Sony Pictures Television, American television studio
 Sony Pictures Television Networks, operator of Sony-branded television channels
 Sony Channel, a brand of general entertainment television channels
 Canal Sony, Latin American television channel
 Sony Pictures Networks India, Indian television broadcaster
 Sony Entertainment Television, Indian television channel